| tries               = {{#expr: 
+4 +2 +5 +1 +0 +2 +5 +5 +1 +1 +3 +8 +5 +6 +9
+3 +6 +1 +3 +11 +2 +0 +9 +9 +2 +5 +9 +9 +3 +6
+2 +9 +4 +6 +7 +8 +4 +5 +2 +3 +3 +7 +2 +4 +10
+4 +8 +5 +3 +10 +7 +8 +5 +8 +5 +7 +5 +7 +7 +7
+4 +7 +3
}}
| top point scorer    = 
| top try scorer      = 
| venue               = Recreation Ground, Camborne
| attendance2         = 4,240
| champions           =  Cornish Pirates
| count               = 1
| runner-up           =  Munster A
| website             = 
| previous year       = 2008-09
| previous tournament = EDF Energy Trophy
| next year           = 2010–11
| next tournament     = 2010–11 British and Irish Cup
}}

The 2009–10 British and Irish Cup was the first season of the annual rugby union competition for second tier, semi-professional clubs from Britain and Ireland.  First round matches began on Friday 20 November 2009 and the final was held on Sunday 16 May 2010.

The first competition was heavily criticised, with one reporter describing it as 'dismal'.

A total of 24 teams from England, Ireland, Scotland and Wales competed in the inaugural competition.  Cornish Pirates lifted the cup, defeating Munster A 23–14 in the final.

Teams 

The allocation of teams was as follows:

 – 12 teams from the RFU Championship
 – 3 Irish provinces represented by 'A' teams
 – 3 Scottish sides, 2 top clubs from the Scottish Premiership and Gael Force, a side made up of a combination of National Academy players
 – 6 top clubs from the Principality Premiership

Competition format 
The teams were divided into four pools of six, playing over five weekends during the Autumn International and Six Nations windows.  The four pool winners contested a knock-out stage, with semi-finals on 24 and 25 April and the final on 16 May.

Pool stages

Pool A

Pool B

Pool C

Pool D

Knock-out stages

Qualifiers 
The four pool winners proceeded to the knock out stages.

Semi-finals

Final

Geography

References

External links 
  Unofficial British and Irish Cup website - latest news, teams etc
  Results from the BBC 

British and Irish Cup
2009–10 rugby union tournaments for clubs
2009–10 RFU Championship
2009–10 in Irish rugby union
2009–10 in Welsh rugby union
2009–10 in Scottish rugby union
2009–10 in British rugby union